Michael or Mike Harris may refer to:

Entertainment
 Michael Harris (glassworker) (1933–1994), English glassworker
 Michael Harris (poet) (born 1944), Canadian poet and translator
 Michael Harris (journalist) (born 1948), Canadian author, investigative journalist, and radio personality
 Michael Harris (trumpeter) (born 1953), musician for the Chicago-based Phenix Horns
 Mike Harris (comics) (born 1962), American comic book artist
 Michael Harris (producer) (born 1964), American television producer and filmmaker
 Mick Harris (born 1966), British musician
 Michael John Harris (born 1980), Canadian magazine editor and writer
 Michael Harris, a character in the television show Falling Skies
 Michael Harris, a character on the TV sitcom Newhart

Politics
 Michael Harris (politician, born 1979), Canadian politician
 Mike Harris (born 1945), Canadian politician, 22nd Premier of Ontario (1995–2002)
 Mike Harris Jr. (born 1985), Canadian politician, son of the Premier of Ontario
 Mike Harris (Michigan politician), member of the Michigan House of Representatives
 Michael Terry Harris (1946-2010), member of the Kansas State Senate

Sports
 Mike Harris (racing driver) (1939–2021), South African racing driver
 Pasty Harris (Michael John Harris, born 1944), English cricketer
 Mike Harris (curler) (born 1967), Canadian curler, silver medalist in the 1998 Winter Olympics
 Mike Harris (rower) (born 1969), British Olympic rower
 Mike Harris (basketball) (born 1983), American basketball player 
 Mike Harris (rugby union) (born 1988), rugby player for Queensland Reds and Melbourne Rebels
 Michael Harris (offensive lineman) (born 1988), American football player
 Mike Harris (cornerback) (born 1989), American football player
 Michael Harris (squash player) (born 1989), English squash player
 Michael Harris (soccer) (born 1991), American soccer player
 Michael Harris II (born 2001), American baseball player

Other
 Michael Harris (Royal Navy officer) (born 1941), Captain of HMS Cardiff during the Falklands War
 Mike Harris (entrepreneur) (born 1949), English business mentor, serial entrepreneur, and author 
 Michael Harris (mathematician) (born 1954), American professor
 Michael Harris (public policy scholar) (born 1956), Israeli-American political scientist and academic administrator
 Michael Darnell Harris (born 1963), American serial killer

See also
 
 
 Harris (surname)